Rashid Rashid is a physician who is an AMA award recipient and FUE innovator regularly featured in the media including the LA times, Wall Street Journal, NBC, and ABC for his work with Neograft and ARTAS system.  He has also been known to regularly publish with fellow AMA award winner Andrew Miller.

References

Living people
Year of birth missing (living people)